A number of models of Sony's PlayStation (PS) video game console were produced from 1994 to 2006. Most revisions of the PlayStation were made to fix known hardware issues or lower production costs and time, while others featured substantial external changes.

Each region has its own model number; for example, Japan received the SCPH-1000, North America received the SCPH-1001, and Europe received the SCPH-1002. The final digit in the model number is the region code of the console; many games are restricted to certain regions, and the system software displays in different languages.

Revisions of standard PlayStation hardware  

The PlayStation went through a number of variants during its production run, each accompanied by a change in the part number. From an external viewpoint, the most notable change was the gradual reduction in the number of external connectors from the back of the unit. This started very early on with the original Japanese launch units; the SCPH-1000, released on 3 December 1994, was the only model that had an S-Video port, which was removed on the next release. This also led to a discrepancy where the U.S. and European launch units had the same part number series (SCPH-100x) as the Japanese launch units, but had different hardware (Rev. B silicon and no S-Video port)—their technical equivalents were the Japanese SCPH-3000, so for consistency should have been SCPH-3001 and SCPH-3002. Inconsistent numbering was also used for the Yaroze machines, which were based on SCPH-5000 and later 1001/1002 hardware, but numbered DTL-H3000, DTL-H3001, and DTL-H3002. Also, the first models (DTL-H1000, DTL-H1001, DTL-H1002) had problems with printf function and developers had to use another function instead.

This series of machines had a reputation for CD drive problemsthe original optical pickup sled (KSM-440AAM) was made of thermoplastic and placed close to the power supply, eventually leading to uneven wear that moved the laser into a position where it was no longer parallel with the CD surface. Late KSM-440ACM drives had the sled replaced with a die-cast one with hard nylon inserts in order to address the issue.

The original hardware design included dual-ported VRAM as graphics memory, but due to a shortage in parts, Sony redesigned the GPU to use SGRAM instead (which could simulate dual-porting to some extent by using two banks). At the same time the GPU was upgraded to utilize smoother shading, resulting in overall better image quality compared to earlier models, which were more prone to banding; additionally, performance for transparency effects was improved, resulting in less slowdown in scenes using this effect heavily. This Rev. C hardware first appeared in late 1995 and, unlike in Japan, was not marked with a model number change in NTSC-U and PAL territories - SCPH-1001/1002 systems can have either revision, as the change happened between revisions of the PU-8 mainboard.

The PAL region consoles from SCPH-1002 up to SCPH-5552 were different from the systems released in other regions in that they had a different menu design; a grey blocked background with square icons for the Memory Card (an icon showing a PlayStation with 2 memory cards inserted) and CD player (an icon with musical keyboards) menus. The CD player also included reverberation effects unique to those systems until the release of the PS one in 2000, which featured a slightly modified version of the BIOS.

With the release of the SCPH-5000 series being produced only in Japan, it followed the same exterior design as the Japanese SCPH-3xxx series, its only differences being that it was switched to Rev. C hardware (same as late 1001/1002 units) with some upgrades to flawed components from previous models and a reduced retail price. This was followed by the first major consolidation, SCPH-550x/5001 and PAL-exclusive SCPH-5552 units, released in April 1997. This model further addressed the reliability issues with the disc drive assembly by placing the drive further away from the power supply in order to reduce heat; the chipset was also redesigned to use digital servo for focus/tracking and also to auto-calibrate the drive, as opposed to manual gain/bias calibration on earlier models. Also, shielding and PSU wiring were simplified, and from the SCPH-5001 on the RCA jacks and RFU power connectors were removed from the rear panel and the printed text on the back was changed to reliefs of the same. Starting with the SCPH-550x series, PAL variants had the "power" and "open" buttons changed from text to symbols, something that would later appear on the redesigned PS one. Originally, the PlayStation was supposed to have provision on Video CD support, but this feature was only included on the Asian exclusive SCPH-5903 model.

These were followed by the SCPH-700x and SCPH-750x series, released in April 1998. They are externally identical to the SCPH-500x machines, but have internal changes made to reduce manufacturing costs (for example, the system RAM went from 4 chips to 1, and the CD controller went from 3 chips to 1). In addition, a slight change of the start-up screen was made; the diamond remains unchanged but the font used for Sony Computer and Entertainment is now consistent, making the words appear smaller than the diamond overall, and the trademark symbol (™) is now placed after "Computer Entertainment" instead of after the diamond, as it was on the earlier models. New to the SCPH-700x series was the introduction of the "Sound Scope"light show music visualizations. These were accessible by pressing the Select button while playing any normal audio CD in the system's CD player. While watching these visualizations, players could also add various effects like color cycling or motion blur and can save/load their memory card. These were seen on the SCPH-700x, 750x, 900x, and PS one models. 

The final revision to the original PlayStation was the SCPH-900x series, released in May 1999. These had the same hardware as the SCPH-750x models, except the parallel port was removed and the size of the PCB is further reduced. The removal of the parallel port is partially due to the fact that Sony did not release an official add-on for it; it was used for cheat cartridges, and for the parallel port to defeat the regional lockouts and copy protection. The PlayStation Link Cable connection was supported by only a handful of games. The SCPH-900x was the last model to support it, as the Serial I/O port was removed on all PS one models. 

The PS one, released on 7 July 2000, was originally based on essentially the same hardware as the SCPH-900x; the serial port was removed, the controller/memory card ports moved to the main PCB and the internal power supply replaced with an external 7.5VDC power adapter with the other required power rails being generated internally on the main using a mixture of regulators and DC/DC converters for the various rails. It also incorporated a slightly modified version of the menu design previously used only on PAL consoles. The later revision (still designated as SCPH-10x but with a different PM-41(2) main circuit board) was functionally identical, but reduced manufacturing cost for a last time by moving to more highly integrated chips, namely the replacement of external RAM with on-chip RAM, which both reduced the parts count and allowed the use of smaller and cheaper packages by reducing the number of pins required.

Debugging units 

There were also debugging consoles - these were generally in either blue or green cases, although there were some special production units (mostly intended for use as show demo units) that were grey, the same as the retail consoles.  The debug units were designed to be as close as possible to retail consoles, so they only had 2MB of ram (the developer boards had 8MB) and had standard retail boot ROMs. The only real difference is that the CD controller was reprogrammed so that it would identify any disc that had a data track as being "licensed", rather than requiring the region code in the lead-in that was present on pressed PlayStation CDs. This was done to allow developers to burn games to CD-R for testing. A side-effect of this was that most debug consoles would also boot discs from other regions (one notable exception being the later NTSC:J debugs, which only boot Japanese titles), although this was not officially supported. Sony made specific debug consoles for each region, and the TRC (technical requirement checklist) provided by Sony for each region required testing the title on the correct debug stations.

The reason for the two different case colors was a hardware change that Sony had made fairly early in the PlayStation production cycle - the original machines were built using Rev. A (early Japan market units) or Rev. B (later Japan units, US and Europe) hardware, both using the same GPU with VRAM to store the video data. Later models used Rev. C silicon and SGRAM - although the two chipsets had very similar performance, and Rev. C was explicitly designed with compatibility in mind, they were not identical - the Rev. C version was significantly faster at doing alpha blending, and hence the PS "semitransparent" writing mode - it was also rather slow at certain screen memory block moves (basically, ones involving narrow vertical strips of the display) on top of this there were some minor hardware bugs in the older silicon that had been addressed by including workarounds for them in the libraries - the later library versions checked the GPU type at startup time and disabled the patches if they were not needed. Because this made the two machine types quite significantly different from each other, the developer had to test the title on both machines before submitting. The blue debugs (DTL-H100x, DTL-H110x) had the old silicon and the green ones (DTL-H120x) had the new silicon.

Net Yaroze

In 1997, Sony released a version of the PlayStation called the Net Yaroze. It only came via mail order and was more expensive than the regular PlayStation ($750 instead of $299 for the original PlayStation). It had a matte black finish instead of the usual gray, and most importantly, came with tools and instructions that allowed a user to be able to program PlayStation games and applications without the need for a full development unit, which was more expensive than a normal PlayStation (official development kits cost around $50,000.00 at the time). It was only available to approved video game developers, who needed to sign an agreement that they wouldn't distribute their games to anyone else or try to reverse-engineer the hardware. The Net Yaroze lacked many of the features the full developer suite provided, lacking the on-demand support and code libraries that licensed developers had. Programmers were also limited by the 2 MB of total game space that the Net Yaroze allowed. The amount of space may seem small, but games like Ridge Racer ran entirely from the system RAM (except for the streamed music tracks). It was unique in that it was the only officially retailed PlayStation with no regional lockout; it would play games from any territory. It would not however play CD-R discs, so it was not possible to create self-booting Yaroze games without a modified PlayStation.

PS One

The PS One (officially stylized as PS one and alternatively spelled PSOne and PSone) is a smaller, redesigned version of the original PlayStation platform. (Dimensions are 38 mm × 193 mm × 144 mm versus 45 mm × 260 mm × 185 mm.) It was released on 7 July 2000, and went on to outsell all other consoles throughout the remainder of the year—including Sony's own PlayStation 2. The PS One is fully compatible with all PlayStation software, but compatibility with peripherals may vary. The PS One model also had additional changes, including the removal of the parallel and serial ports from the rear of the console, and the removal of the reset button (the power button is also labeled as a reset button, but the console cannot be reset without entirely turning it off).

In 2002, Sony released a version with a  LCD screen and an adaptor (though it did not have a battery: it is powered by plugging the adaptor in a main socket, or in a car); it was called the Combo pack. The included LCD screen includes a headphone jack (for headphones or other audio connection) and an AV mini jack for connecting camcorders or other devices. The LCD screen was also sold separately as a standalone add-on.

Comparison of models

Specialty models
These models, intended for developers, all feature A/V Direct Out, parallel and serial ports; none of them feature Sound Scope. They also have low-quality CD drives. These models can also boot software with any region code (except for those with later Japanese boot ROMs).

Region codes

The last digit of the PlayStation model number denotes the region in which it was sold:
 0 is Japan (Japanese boot ROM, NTSC-J region, NTSC video, 100 V PSU)
 1 is USA/Canada (English boot ROM, NTSC-U/C region, NTSC video, 120 V PSU)
 2 is PAL regions (English boot ROM, PAL region, PAL Video, 220-240 V PSU). Sub-models exist differing in bundled accessories:
 2A is Australia. Australian mains cord and composite (RCA) cable.
 2B is United Kingdom and Ireland. BS 1363 domestic mains cord and RF modulator instead of composite cable.
 2C is for other PAL countries such as the rest of Europe. Europlug mains cord and composite cable plus RCA to SCART adapter.
 3 is Asia (English boot ROM, NTSC-J region, NTSC video, Wide range 110-240 V PSU)

Quality of construction
The first batch of PlayStations used a KSM-440AAM laser unit whose case and all movable parts were completely made out of plastic. Over time, friction caused the plastic tray to wear out—usually unevenly. The placement of the laser unit close to the power supply accelerated wear because of the additional heat, which made the plastic even more vulnerable to friction. Eventually, the tray would become so worn that the laser no longer pointed directly at the CD and games would no longer load. Sony first addressed the problem by making the tray out of die-cast metal, and additionally also placed the laser unit farther away from the power supply on later models of the PlayStation.

Some units, particularly the early 100x models, would be unable to play FMV or music correctly, resulting in skipping or freezing. In more extreme cases the PlayStation would only work correctly when turned onto its side or upside down.

See also
 PlayStation 2 models
 PlayStation 3 models
 PlayStation 4
 PlayStation 5 models

References

Models
Video game hardware
Electronics lists
Sony consoles